William Roughead (19 September 1905 – 22 April 1975) was a Scotland international rugby union player.

Rugby Union career

Amateur career

Roughead played for Edinburgh Academicals.

He also played for London Scottish.

Provincial career

He played for Anglo-Scots against Provinces District on 21 December 1929.

He captained the Anglo-Scots against Provinces in January 1931.

International career

He played for Scotland 12 times in the period 1927 to 1932.

He captained Scotland against Wales in February 1931, and it was noted that the game for the Scots was played 'under the shadow of a great loss' as former SRU President James Aikman Smith had just died.

Business career

He became a literary agent. He compiled an Anthology of prose and verse by Hilaire Belloc.

Family

His father William Roughead (1870-1952) was a lawyer and amateur criminologist. His mother was Janey Thomson More (1871-1940). They had 4 children: a daughter Winifred Carfrae Roughead (1901-1929), and sons John Carfrae Roughead (1902-1981), Francis More Roughead (1904-1947) and William.

His brother Francis More Roughead also played for Edinburgh Academicals.

References

1905 births
1975 deaths
Scottish rugby union players
Scotland international rugby union players
Edinburgh Academicals rugby union players
London Scottish F.C. players
Scottish Exiles (rugby union) players
Rugby union players from Edinburgh
Rugby union hookers